"Half Man Half Machine" is a song by the Welsh Rap act Goldie Lookin Chain from their Greatest Hits album. In May 2004, the song reached #32 on the UK Singles Chart.

Track listing

A1  Half Man Half Machine
A2  Half Man Half Machine (Clean)
A3  Half Man Half Machine (Instrumental)
B1  Self Suicide
B2  Self Suicide (Clean)
B3  Self Suicide (Instrumental)

References 

2004 singles
Goldie Lookin Chain songs
Atlantic Records singles
2004 songs